John Bartlow Martin (4 August 1915, in Hamilton, Ohio – 3 January 1987, in Highland Park, Illinois) was an American diplomat, author of 15 books, ambassador, and speechwriter and confidant to many Democratic politicians including Adlai Stevenson, John F. Kennedy, Robert F. Kennedy, Lyndon B. Johnson, and Hubert Humphrey.

Early life
Martin was born in Hamilton, Ohio to John, a carpenter and contractor, and Laura Bartlow Martin, and as a young child moved to Indianapolis. Martin grew up in an unhappy childhood, plagued by the death of his two brothers. He graduated from high school at age 16 and was expelled in his first year from DePauw University, but he later graduated there with a degree in journalism.

Journalism
With the impact of his dark childhood and onset of the Great Depression, Martin's early journalism career focused on deep concern for the underprivileged and forgotten, such as criminals, the impoverished, the working class, and the mentally ill. His work appeared in such publications as Saturday Evening Post, LIFE, Colliers, Atlantic Monthly, and Harper's. He won the highest magazine writing honor, the Benjamin Franklin Magazine Award, for four consecutive years. A true crime article Martin wrote, "Smashing the Bookie Gang Marauders" was made into the successful 1949 movie Scene of the Crime.  It was the only movie based on his work.

Political career
Martin was hired in 1952 as a speechwriter by Illinois Governor Adlai Stevenson, and later worked on the Kennedy presidential campaign. Martin was sent by Kennedy on a fact-finding mission to the Dominican Republic after the assassination of the dictator Rafael Trujillo in May 1961, and delivered his report in September. In gratitude for his analysis, he became the U.S. Ambassador to the Dominican Republic, serving from 9 March 1962 to 25 September 1963. As Ambassador, Martin was a critic of the new president, Juan Bosch. According to the historian Stephen G. Rabe, Martin "fancied himself a Roman consul whose word should be law in the Dominican Republic." Martin resigned shortly after the Kennedy assassination, on the day in which Bosch was toppled in a coup d'etat, but returned to the Dominican Republic as a special envoy in 1965 during the invasion dispatched by Johnson.

Death and legacy
He died in Highland Park, Illinois in 1987 of throat cancer.

In 2008, The Library of America selected his story "Butcher's Dozen" for inclusion in its two-century retrospective of American True Crime.

Selected bibliography
 Adlai Stevenson of Illinois (828 pages), Doubleday & Co., Garden City, NY, 1976.
 Adlai Stevenson and the World (946 pages), Doubleday & Co., Garden City, NY, 1977.
 Break Down the Walls (310 pages), Ballantine Books, New York, NY, 1954 ; an account of the 1952 riots in the State Prison of Southern Michigan at Jackson

References

Further reading
 Boomhower, Ray E. John Bartlow Martin: A Voice for the Underdog (Indiana University Press, 2015) xviii, 386 pp.
 Boomhower, Ray E. "Fighting the Good Fight: John Bartlow Martin and Hubert Humphrey's 1968 Presidential Campaign." Indiana Magazine of History (2020) 116#1 pp 1–29.

External links
John Bartlow Martin, 71, Author and Envoy, Dies (New York Times)
Martin, John Bartlow (Harper's Magazine)
John Bartlow Martin: Profile
Our Land, Our Literature: John Martin
John Bartlow Martin Papers at the Seeley G. Mudd Manuscript Library, Princeton University

1915 births
1987 deaths
20th-century American male writers
20th-century American non-fiction writers
Ambassadors of the United States to the Dominican Republic
American male journalists
Deaths from cancer in Illinois
Deaths from esophageal cancer
DePauw University alumni
Journalists from Ohio
People from Hamilton, Ohio
Writers from Indianapolis
Writers from Ohio
20th-century American journalists